Antônio Guedes Muniz (12 June 1900 — 28 Jun 1985) was the pioneer of the Brazilian aviation industry.

Early life and career
Muniz originally wanted to become a priest, which is why he initially attended a seminary, but changed his mind and transferred to the Anglo-Brazilian college in Rio de Janeiro. After college, starting in 1918, he attended the University of Rio de Janeiro, which he graduated from in January 1921 as an engineering candidate. He joined the Brazilian Army and did his service with the Companhia de Aviação da Arma de Engenharia, whose main mission was to maintain the Army Air Force Base and later the Air Force Base Campo dos Afonsos.

Personal life
On January 13, 1923, he married Lucia da Rocha e Silva. In the same year, he organized the Military Meteorological Services and became its first director.

Projects
In August 1925, he was sent to France to study aeronautical engineering at the École Supérieure de Aéronautique. During this time he developed several aircraft, which he named the M-1, M-2, M-3, M-4 and M-5. Only the Muniz M-5 was built by Caudron in 1929 with funds from the Federal government of Brazil and after successful test flights in France, was brought to Brazil. Upon his return to Brazil, he became director of the Técnicos da Aviação Militar and developed other aircraft, several of which were built and successful. During the 1st National Aeronautical Congress in 1934, Muniz proposed to produce airplanes domestically instead of always importing them. Eventually, the Companhia Nacional de Navegação Aérea was founded, which produced several of Muniz's designs.

Gallery

Honours 
 Grand Officer of the Order of Aeronautical Merit (10 December 1950)

References

Notes

Bibliography

External links

1900 births
1985 deaths
Aviation pioneers
Brazilian inventors
Brazilian scientists
Brazilian people of Portuguese descent
Brazilian Roman Catholics
People from Alagoas
People from Maceió
Brazilian chairpersons of corporations
 
Aviation history of Brazil
Aviation history of France
Brazilian aviators
Aviation inventors
Marshals of Brazil